The 1928 New Hampshire Wildcats football team was an American football team that represented the University of New Hampshire as a member of the New England Conference during the 1928 college football season. In its 13th season under head coach William "Butch" Cowell, the team compiled a 3–2–3 record, and were outscored by their opponents, 34–30. The team was shut out five times, although three of those games ended as scoreless ties. The team played its home games in Durham, New Hampshire, at Memorial Field.

Schedule

The 1928 game was the last meeting between New Hampshire and Rhode Island until 1942.

The Maine game was attended by Governor of New Hampshire Huntley N. Spaulding.

Wildcat captain Lyle Harlan Farrell would go on to serve as headmaster at Proctor Academy in Andover, New Hampshire, where the fieldhouse carries his name.

Notes

References

New Hampshire
New Hampshire Wildcats football seasons
New Hampshire Wildcats football